Zachary Carter (born April 7, 1999) is an American football defensive tackle for the Cincinnati Bengals of the National Football League (NFL). He played college football at Florida.

Early life and high school
Carter grew up in Tampa, Florida and attended Hillsborough High School. Carter was rated a four-star recruit and committed to play college football at Florida.

College career
Carter redshirted his true freshman season. He played in nine games as a reserve defensive lineman in his redshirt freshman season and had eight tackles, one tackle for loss, and two passes broken up. Carter led the Gators with five sacks and 9.5 tackles for loss as a redshirt junior. Carter considered entering the 2021 NFL Draft, but opted to stay at Florida for his redshirt senior season.

Professional career

Carter was selected by the Cincinnati Bengals in the third round, 95th overall, of the 2022 NFL Draft.

References

External links
 Cincinnati Bengals bio
 Florida Gators bio

Living people
American football defensive tackles
Players of American football from Tampa, Florida
Florida Gators football players
1999 births
Cincinnati Bengals players